Achaea thermopera is a species of moth of the family Erebidae first described by George Hampson in 1913. It is found in Burundi, the Democratic Republic of the Congo, Kenya, Rwanda, Sudan, Tanzania, Uganda and Nigeria.

The larvae have been recorded on Leptospermum variegatum.

References

Achaea (moth)
Lepidoptera of West Africa
Erebid moths of Africa
Moths described in 1913